Yavor Svetozarov Konov , (born 23 October 1964 in Sofia, Bulgaria), is a Bulgarian classical pianist, professor, author and translator of books, articles and textbooks in music.

Early life and education
Yavor Konov studied piano with Lyubomir Pipkov at the National Music High School in Sofia in 1983 and in 1991 he studied musicology (polyphony) and chorus conducting at the National Academy of Music, Sofia. Four years later he finished harpsichord master class in Orvieto, Italy. Successfully presented his theses, Konov became Doctor of Art in 1998 and Doctor of Art Sciences in 2006.

Career
For the period of November 1992 to November 2010 he worked at South-West University "Neofit Rilski" in Blagoevgrad. In 2005 Yavor Konov became Professor of Polyphony at the Department of Music at the Faculty of Arts. In 2008 he became Director of the University Resource Center for Francophone Studies at South-West University. Since December, 2010 Yavor Konov has been working as a professor at the Department of Music at New Bulgarian University, Sofia. He delivered lectures as a guest-lecturer at Sofia University and Krastyo Sarafov National Academy for Theatre and Film Arts, as well.

Besides being a lecturer, prof. Konov was a co-founder and secretary of the Music Society "Vassil Stefanov" (Sofia). He was also a deputy editor-in-chief of the magazine Music. Yesterday. Today from its setting up to 2012.

Personal life
Yavor Konov has been married to Assoc. Prof. Dr. Theodora Bolyarova-Konova, PhD since 1999. They have 2 children – Theresa (2000) and Andrey (2007).

Publications
Prof. Yavor Konov is an author of more than 200 publications, including textbooks, annotated translations, monographs, articles, scientific studies, etc. 
Textbooks
"About Polyphony" (1995, 2/2001, 3/2003)
"Culture and Musical Art" (1997)
"Ideas and Approaches for Natural Piano Playing" (2003)

Monographs
“First Harpsichord Treatise: “The Principles of Harpsichord” of de Saint-Lambert, 1702” (1998)
“Sébastien de Brossard and his Dictionary of Music” (2003)
“Over Gioseffo Zarlino and The Art of Counterpoint” (2004)
“Lexicographic, Historiographic & Bibliographic Heritage of Sébastien de Brossard (1655–1730): Ecclesiastic, Musician & Erudite (2008)
“Sébastien de Brossard: Dictionary of Music (1705). Yavor Konov – Translation and Comments” (2010)

Annotated translations of
“The Principles of Harpsichord” (Paris, 1702) and “New Treatise about the Accompaniment of Harpsichord, Organ and other instruments” (Paris, 1707) by de Saint-Lambert (1998)
“Practical Elements of Thorough-Bass” by W. A. Mozart (1999)
“The Art of Counterpoint” (1558) by Gioseffo Zarlino (2003)

Electronic publications
Konov, Yavor (2014) About Johan Sebastian Bach, Inventions, Teaching at NBU. Working Paper. Scientific electronic archive of NBU
Ferran, Dominique and Konov, Yavor (2014) Historical review of old fingerings / Dominique Ferran, Yavor Konov, Translation and Comments. Scientific electronic archive of NBU
Spit, Noel and Konov, Yavor (2014) Harpsichord playing / tapping / according to Francois Couprein, Saint-Lambert and Ramo / Noel Spit, Yavor Konov, Translation and Comments. Scientific electronic archive of NBU
Bomon, Olivier and Seru, Bruno and Konov, Yavor (2015) Harpsichord in all its states: An Interview with Professor Olivier Bomon, Harpsichordist, July 4-th and 8-th, 2003 / Yavor Konov, Translation and Comments. Scientific electronic archive of NBU
Konov, Yavor (2015) What could we talk about to anyone who came to study music and musicology at NBU. Scientific electronic archive of NBU

Acknowledgement
His contribution to music and musicology is highly appreciated by the most authoritative institutions in this field – the Studio of Studies at the Baroque Music Center in Versailles and the Faculty of Music and Musicology of the University in Paris (Sorbonne). Prof. Yavor Konov is identified as an "Excellent Specialist" (2009).
“Round Table around Yavor Konov” was held on November 24-th, 2011 in the Library of Versailles. The event was organized in honor of Bulgarian edition of "The Dictionary of Music" by de Brossard and on the initiative of leading French musicologists. The case is considered to create a precedent in French-Bulgarian relations.

Awards and honors
"Book of the Year" – award of the Union of Bulgarian Composers, section "Musicologists" (2003, 2004, 2008, 2010, 2019).

Notes

External links
Official Site

1964 births
Living people
Bulgarian classical pianists
Harpsichordists
Bulgarian music educators
Academic staff of New Bulgarian University
Musicians from Sofia
21st-century classical pianists